Uror is a county in Jonglei State, South Sudan. It has nine payams: Pathai, Pieri, Pulchuol, Palouny, Motdit, Motot, Karam, Pajut, Weykol and Padiek.

References

Counties of Jonglei State